Inverlochy (IPA:[ˈinivɪɾʲˈɫ̪ɔxɪ]) is a village north of Fort William, Highland, Scotland. Inverlochy is part of the Great Glen Way, a popular hiking and cycling route from Fort William to Inverness.

History
The village was purpose-built in the 1920s by the British Aluminium Company to house workers.

Prior to this, nearby Inverlochy Castle was the location of battles in 1431 and 1645.

See also
Lochaber

References

Villages in Highland (council area)
Populated places in Lochaber